A permanent under-secretary of state, known informally as a permanent secretary, is the most senior civil servant of a ministry in the United Kingdom, charged with running the department on a day-to-day basis. Similar offices, often employing different terms, exist in many other Westminster-style systems and in some other governments. In the United States, the equivalent position is a Deputy Secretary of an executive department, though British permanent secretaries are career civil servants (whereas Deputy Secretaries are political appointees).

Permanent secretaries are appointed under a scheme in which the prime minister has the final say in the recruitment process; the PM now chooses directly from a list created by the Civil Service Commissioners, rather than only having a veto over the Commissioners' preferred candidate. The first permanent secretary to be appointed in this way was Melanie Dawes in the Department for Communities and Local Government.

Some permanent secretaries do not hold the position of permanent secretary, but still hold that grade. The Transparency of Lobbying, Non-party Campaigning and Trade Union Administration Act 2014 explains that a permanent secretary, for the purposes of section 2 of that Act, is a person serving in government in any of the following positions: Permanent Secretary, Second Permanent Secretary, Cabinet Secretary, Chief Executive of His Majesty's Revenue and Customs, Chief Medical Officer, Director of Public Prosecutions, First Parliamentary Counsel, Government Chief Scientific Adviser, Head of the Civil Service or Prime Minister's Adviser for Europe and Global Issues.

History 
When Lord Grey took office as Prime Minister of the United Kingdom in 1830, John Barrow was especially requested to continue serving as Secretary in his department (the Admiralty), starting the principle that senior civil servants stay in office on change of government and serve in a non-partisan manner. It was during Barrow's occupancy of the post that it was renamed permanent secretary.

Role 
The permanent secretary, who in some but not all government departments is known formally as the permanent under-secretary of state, is the accounting officer for a department, meaning that they are answerable to parliament for ensuring that the department appropriately spends money granted by parliament. Permanent secretaries are thus frequently called for questioning by the Public Accounts Committee and select committees of the House of Commons. The permanent secretary usually chairs a department's management board which consists of executive members (other civil servants in the department) and non-executive directors. In the 1970s the permanent secretary to Tony Benn when he was Secretary of State for Industry was Peter Carey. After Benn spent government money on worker cooperatives, notably a motorbike company (Meriden Motorcycle Co-operative), Carey went before the Public Accounts Committee and expressed the opinion that his minister's expenditure had been ultra vires. Benn was soon moved to the Department of Energy, while Carey received a knighthood in the following honours list.

Some larger departments also have a second permanent secretary who acts as deputy. In the early 1970s, in a major reorganisation of Whitehall, many smaller ministries were amalgamated into larger departments. Following this reorganisation, virtually all departments had second permanent secretaries for a time, though this is no longer as common.

The most senior civil servant is the Cabinet Secretary, currently Simon Case; he is normally also the Head of the Home Civil Service. The holder of this office is distinct from other officials of permanent secretary rank within the Cabinet Office. By convention, the Prime Minister is Minister for the Civil Service and as such makes regulations regarding the service and has authority over it. These duties are delegated to the Minister for the Cabinet Office.

Honours 
Permanent secretaries are usually created a Knight or Dame Commander of the Order of the Bath after five or more years of service in the grade or on retirement if not already holding the title (although the Permanent Secretary of the Foreign and Commonwealth Office will be created a Knight or Dame Commander of the Order of St Michael and St George instead). The most senior permanent secretaries, such as the Cabinet Secretary, may be created a Knight Grand Cross of the Order of the Bath, and even be given a life peerage after retirement. For salary comparison purposes, the permanent secretary is deemed broadly equivalent to a general and to a High Court judge.

Current permanent secretaries 
Below is a list of the individuals in the UK government at the grade of permanent secretary.

See also 

 His Majesty's Civil Service
 His Majesty's Diplomatic Service
 Parliamentary Private Secretary
 Parliamentary Under-Secretary of State
 Principal secretary
 Private secretary
 Undersecretary
 Yes, Minister, a satirical examination of role of a permanent secretary

References

External links 

 List of current UK Permanent Secretaries

Civil Service (United Kingdom)
Civil service positions in the United Kingdom